The 26th annual Berlin International Film Festival was held from 25 June – 6 July 1976. The Golden Bear was awarded to the American film Buffalo Bill and the Indians, or Sitting Bull's History Lesson directed by Robert Altman.

The Japanese film In the Realm of the Senses by Nagisa Oshima was confiscated during the Berlinale premiere of the film and banned after a court hearing. Charlie Chaplin's 1957 film A King in New York was also screened at the festival.

Jury

The following people were announced as being on the jury for the festival:
 Jerzy Kawalerowicz director, screenwriter and politician (Poland) - Jury President
 Hannes Schmidt, production designer (West Germany)
 Marjorie Bilbow, writer (United Kingdom)
 Michel Ciment, writer, journalist and film critic (France)
 Guido Cinotti, historian and essayist (Italy)
 Georgiy Daneliya, director and screenwriter (Soviet Union)
 Wolf Hart, director of photography (West Germany)
 Bernard R. Kantor, publisher and academic (United Kingdom)
 Fernando Macotela, writer and film critic (Mexico)
 Márta Mészáros, director and screenwriter (Hungary)
 Shūji Terayama, director, poet and playwright (Japan)

Films in competition
The following films were in competition for the Golden Bear award:

Out of competition
 All the President's Men, directed by Alan J. Pakula (USA)

Key
{| class="wikitable" width="550" colspan="1"
| style="background:#FFDEAD;" align="center"| †
|Winner of the main award for best film in its section
|}

Awards

The following prizes were awarded by the Jury:
 Golden Bear: Buffalo Bill and the Indians, or Sitting Bull's History Lesson by Robert Altman
 Silver Bear – Special Jury Prize: Canoa: A Shameful Memory by Felipe Cazals
 Silver Bear for Best Director: Mario Monicelli for Caro Michele
 Silver Bear for Best Actress: Jadwiga Barańska for Noce i dnie
 Silver Bear for Best Actor: Gerhard Olschewski for Verlorenes Leben
 Silver Bear for an outstanding single achievement: László Lugossy for Azonosítás
 Silver Bear: Baghé sangui by Parviz Kimiavi
FIPRESCI Award
Long Vacations of 36 by Jaime Camino

References

External links
26th Berlin International Film Festival 1976
1976 Berlin International Film Festival
Berlin International Film Festival:1976 at Internet Movie Database

26
1976 film festivals
1976 in West Germany
1970s in West Berlin